Jung Min-joon (born 2016) is a South Korean child actor.

Filmography

Film

Television series

Awards and nominations

References

External links 
 

2016 births
Living people
21st-century South Korean male actors
South Korean male television actors
South Korean male film actors
South Korean male child actors